The Cham Islands constitute a group of 8 small islands of Quảng Nam, which form a part of the Cu Lao Cham Marine Park, a world Biosphere Reserve recognized by UNESCO, in the South China Sea (East Sea) in Vietnam. The islands are approachable from Cửa Đại beach. The islands are also recognized as Vietnam's national scenic site.

The islands grouped under the Cham Islands are: the  Hòn Lao (Pearl), Hòn Dài (long), Hòn Mồ (tomb), Hòn Khô mẹ, Hòn Khô con (dry), Hòn Lá (leaf), Hòn Tai (ear) and Hòn Ông (east wind). The Cham Islands are under the administration of Tân Hiệp Commune of Hội An city in Quảng Nam Province.

The occupation of the people of the islands is mainly fishing.

Cu Lao Cham Islands' ancient landscape offers many sand beaches, forested hills and the sea. Facilities for camping, swimming and scuba diving are available. The corals and marine life are an attraction in these island waters.

Geography

Cu Lao Cham island group is a lower extension in SE of the granite block named Bach Ma - Hai Van - Son Tra belonging to the Hai Van complex of early Triassic age, mainly composed of biotite granite and two-mica granites .

On this largest island, the two fishing villages are Bai Lang, with docking piers, and the smaller Bai Huong. Bai Chong Beach is the most notable beach on the island. The islands fall under the administrative jurisdiction of Hội An and acts as a defensive wall for the ancient town.

Seafarers were attracted to these ancient islands for favourable anchorage facilities off Bai Lang village on Hon Lao island, where a freshwater supply was also located. This is corroborated by early Chinese charts from 700 AD.

The islands are accessible by a three hour canoe journey, or by speed boats in about half an hour from the nearest mainland point.

History
Archaeologists claim that Cham Islands were first settled by Cham people about 3,000 years ago. However, business contacts were established with other countries about 1,000 years ago. The Cham islands were used for transhipment to the mainland by the Cham. Many architectural monuments dated to the 18th and 20th century are reported, which include the Than Yen Sao shrine built in 1843 at Bai Huong, and the Hai Tang Pagodas built in 1753 on the western hillside of Hon Lao. Small monuments, dikes, and basins to grow rice on terraces are also seen in the interior forest areas.

Resources
Medicinal plants have also been inventoried on the islands.

The traditional resources of the Cham people of the islands comprise rice farming, fishing, trading in pepper, cinnamon bark, ivory and wood with neighbouring countries, accessed through the port of Hoi An.

The islands are known for the Salanganes swallows whose nests have been a source of revenue to the local people. The expensive Chinese dish of bird's nest soup is made out of these nests. Thus, swallow nest harvesting has become an important industry in the islands, which also provides revenue to the state. The annual swallow harvest is reported to be about 1.4 tons, valued at US$4,000 per kilogram.

Gallery

References

References
Hardy, Andrew (2009): "Eaglewood and the Economic History of Champa and Central Vietnam" in Hardy, Andrew et al.: Champa and the Archeology of My Son (Vietnam). NUS Press, Singapore

External links

Coordinates of Cham Islands
Travel guide to Cham Islands
Information about Cham Islands

Landforms of Quảng Nam province
Islands of Vietnam
Biosphere reserves of Vietnam